Glenn Anders (September 1, 1889 – October 26, 1981) was an American actor, most notable for his work on the stage.

Early life
Glenn Anders was born in Los Angeles, California, the son of a Swedish immigrant father. He attended the Wallace dramatic school in California, and began his career performing in vaudeville on the Orpheum circuit. He arrived in New York City in 1919 and attended Columbia University from 1919 until 1921.

Career
He made his Broadway debut in 1919 in Just Around the Corner. In 1921, he scored the male lead in The Demi-Virgin, a farce that was controversial, but a hit at the box office. Anders had a distinguished career on Broadway, appearing in three Pulitzer Prize winning plays: Hell Bent for Heaven (1924), written by Hatcher Hughes; They Knew What They Wanted (1924) by Sidney Howard; and Strange Interlude (1928) by Eugene O'Neill.  He made a handful of film and TV appearances, most famously as a scheming lawyer in Orson Welles' The Lady from Shanghai (1947). Other film roles included M (1951), a remake of Fritz Lang's 1931 classic.

Death
On October 26, 1981, Anders died aged 92 in Englewood, New Jersey, at the Actors' Fund Home. He is interred in Kensico Cemetery in Valhalla, New York.

Filmography

References

External links

portraits(NY Public Library, B. Rose collection)

American male film actors
American male stage actors
Columbia College (New York) alumni
People from Englewood, New Jersey
1889 births
1981 deaths
American people of Swedish descent
Burials at Kensico Cemetery
20th-century American male actors